Cranbury Brook, also known as Cranberry Brook, is a tributary of the Millstone River in Middlesex and Monmouth Counties, New Jersey in the United States.

Course
It flows westward, crossing Perrineville Road. It receives several tributaries from the area and crosses Union Valley Road and Applegarth Road. It then crosses the New Jersey Turnpike, and is dammed to form Brainerd Lake. As a lake it crosses Route 130 and South Main Street in the town of Cranbury. It continues flowing west through the Cranbury Preserve and receives the Cedar Brook. It then crosses George Davison Ave and forms another dammed section known as Plainsboro Pond.

Accessibility
Cranbury Brook is easily accessed by many road crossings and dammed sections such as Brainerd Lake.

Sister tributaries
Beden Brook
Bear Brook
Devils Brook
Harrys Brook
Heathcote Brook
Indian Run Brook
Little Bear Brook
Millstone Brook
Peace Brook
Rocky Brook
Royce Brook
Simonson Brook
Six Mile Run
Stony Brook
Ten Mile Run
Van Horn Brook

See also
List of rivers of New Jersey

References

External links
USGS Coordinates in Google Maps

Rivers of New Jersey
Tributaries of the Raritan River
Rivers of Middlesex County, New Jersey
Rivers of Monmouth County, New Jersey